The Permanent Interstate Committee for Drought Control in the Sahel (French: Comité permanent inter-État de lutte contre la sécheresse au Sahel, abbreviated as CILSS) is an international organization consisting of countries in the Sahel region of Africa.

According to the official homepage, the organization's mandate is to invest in research for food security and the fight against the effects of drought and desertification for a new ecological balance in the Sahel.

The Sahel is a transition area between the very dry North and tropical forests on the coast. It mostly displays bushes, herbs and very small trees and does not offer regular harvests to its inhabitants. Main characteristics include:
 a very irregular and little predictable rainfall, from 200 mm to 2500 mm
 predominance of agriculture and husbandry. More than half of the inhabitants are farmers and agriculture contributes more than 40% to the GDP
 high demographic growth (around 3.1%) and high urban growth (around 7%)

The CILSS was created in 1973 during the first great drought in the region with the aim of mobilizing the population in the Sahel and the international community to facilitate urgent need and the organization of works in various domains i.e. rainfed and irrigated agriculture, environment, transport, and communication. In 1995 it centered its activities on basic food security and the use of natural resources. 

The executive office is located in Ouagadougou, Burkina Faso. 

List of countries that are a member:

 Benin
 Burkina Faso
 Cape Verde
 Chad
 Gambia
 Guinea
 Guinea-Bissau
 Ivory Coast
 Mali
 Mauritania
 Niger
 Senegal
 Togo

See also
2010 Sahel famine

References

External links
 Official "Permanent Interstate Committee for Drought Control in the Sahel" website—
 Institut du Sahel—

Sahel
Sahel
Environmentalism in Africa
International organizations based in Africa
Agricultural organizations
Hydrology organizations
International water associations
Droughts in Africa
Organisations based in Burkina Faso
Organizations based in Cape Verde
Organisations based in Chad
Organisations based in the Gambia
Organisations based in Guinea-Bissau
Organisations based in Mali
Organisations based in Mauritania
Organisations based in Niger
Environmental organisations based in Senegal
Environmental organizations established in 1973
1973 establishments in Africa